Dusk Diver (酉閃町) is a 3D third-person action-adventure beat 'em up video game developed by JFI Games and published by WANIN Games for Microsoft Windows, Nintendo Switch, and PlayStation 4 on October 23, 2019. A sequel, Dusk Diver 2, was released on February 24, 2022, for Microsoft Windows, Nintendo Switch, PlayStation 4, and PlayStation 5.

Plot 

The game's plot revolves around Yang Yumo. One day her and her friend, Yusha, get lost and finds themselves in a twisted version of the city of Ximending. Yumo gets powers to fight the monsters and, with other guardian spirits, she will fight against creatures that are named Chaos Beasts, to keep the boundaries between both versions of the city.

Gameplay 

The game is an anime-style 3D beat 'em up action game with some light role-playing elements. There are some side quests and exploration of Ximending but the core of the gameplay is the battles against the Chaos Beasts. The combat is fast and combo-heavy, combining light and heavy attacks to chain up combo moves, and summoning Guardians to eliminate all enemies. The battlefields get larger as the game goes on leading to fights against a great number of enemies, Yumo has access to a super mode called D Arms, which can be activated after filling its gauge.

As the player builds up their combo meter, the enemies will drop more health and special ability pickups, encouraging the player to not stop fighting, leading to a very fast-paced combat game.

Reception 

Dusk Diver received "mixed or average" reviews, according to review aggregator Metacritic.

References 

2019 video games
PlayStation 4 games
Nintendo Switch games
Video games developed in the United Kingdom
Windows games
Beat 'em ups